László is a Hungarian male given name and surname after the King-Knight Saint Ladislaus I of Hungary (1077–1095). It derives from Ladislav, a variant of Vladislav. Other versions are Lessl or Laszly. The name has a history of being frequently anglicized as Leslie. It is the most common male name among the whole Hungarian male population since 2003.

People with this name are listed below by field.

Given name

Science and mathematics
 László Babai (b. 1950), Hungarian-born American mathematician and computer scientist
 László Lovász (b. 1948), Hungarian mathematician
 László Fejes Tóth (1915–2005), Hungarian mathematician
 László Fuchs (b. 1924), Hungarian-American mathematician
 László Rátz (1863–1930), influential Hungarian mathematics high school teacher
 László Tisza (1907–2009), Professor of Physics Emeritus at the Massachusetts Institute of Technology
 László Mérő (b. 1949),  Hungarian research psychologist and science author

Politics and the military
 László Almásy (politician) (1869–1936), Hungarian jurist, soldier and politician
 László Batthyány-Strattmann (1870–1931), Hungarian aristocrat and physician
 László Ignác Bercsényi (1689–1778), Hungarian-born soldier who became Marshal of France
 László Csány, Hungarian politician, who served as Minister of Public Works and Transport in 1849, martyr of the Hungarian Revolution of 1848
 László Kövér (b. 1959), Hungarian politician and Speaker of the National Assembly of Hungary
 László Rajk (1909–1949), Hungarian communist Minister of the Interior and Minister of Foreign Affairs
 László L. Simon (born 1972), Hungarian politician and writer
 László Sólyom (b. 1942), Hungarian politician, lawyer and librarian; President of Hungary from 2005 to 2010
 László Szalkai (1485–1526), Archbishop of Esztergom and official under King Louis II of Hungary
 László Szapáry (1831–1883), Hungarian general
 László Szőgyény-Marich, Sr. (1806–1893), Hungarian politician
 László Szőgyény-Marich, Jr. (1841–1916), Austro-Hungarian diplomat; son of László Szőgyény-Marich, Sr.
 László Teleki (1811–1861), Hungarian politician and writer
 László Tőkés (b. 1952), Romanian Vice President of the European Parliament

Music
 László Lajtha (1892–1963), composer
 László Simon (1948–2009), Hungarian pianist
 Laszlo Gardony (b. 1956) Hungarian-American pianist, composer

Film
 László Kovács (cinematographer) (1933–2007), Hungarian-American cinematographer of Easy Rider, Five Easy Pieces and Frances
 Peter Lorre (1904–1964), Hungarian-born Hollywood actor born László Löwenstein
 Leslie Howard (actor) (1893–1943), British-Hungarian actor born László Steiner

Sports
 Laszlo Bellak (1911–2006), Hungarian/American world champion table tennis player
 László Bölöni (b. 1953), Romanian-born Hungarian former footballer and coach
 László Cseh (b. 1985), Hungarian swimmer
 László Kubala (1927–2002), Hungarian footballer
 László Kuncz (1957–2020), Hungarian water polo player
 László Papp (1926–2003), Hungarian boxer, the first boxer in Olympic history to win three successive gold medals
 László Szabados (1911–1992), Hungarian swimmer
 László Szollás (1907–1980), Hungarian world champion pairs skater

Other
 László Almásy (1895–1951), Hungarian aristocrat, motorist, aviator, and explorer; basis for the protagonist of the film The English Patient
 László Bárczay (1936–2016), Hungarian chess Grandmaster
 Laszlo Berkowits (1928–2020), Hungarian-born American Reform rabbi
 László Bíró (1899–1985), Hungarian-Argentine inventor of the ballpoint pen
 László Hudec (1893–1958), Hungarian-Slovak architect
 László Krasznahorkai (b. 1954), Hungarian novelist and screenwriter
 László Listi (1628–1662), Hungarian poet executed in Vienna for counterfeiting coins
 László Moholy-Nagy (1895–1946), Hungarian painter of the Bauhaus school
 László Szabó (chess player) (1917–1998), Hungarian Grandmaster
 Laszlo Toth (1938–2012), noted Hungarian-Australian art critic
 Les Murray (1945-2017), born László Ürge, Hungarian-Australian football broadcaster

Fictional characters
 Lazlo (character), in the 2005–08 Cartoon Network series Camp Lazlo
 Lazlo (Suikoden), the protagonist in the Japanese novelization of Suikoden IV
 Laszlo, a human-pig hybrid in the two-part Doctor Who story that begins with Daleks in Manhattan
 Laszlo (The Butcher), the final boss of the Fortress Campaign in the video game Heroes of Might and Magic V: Hammers of Fate
 Laszlo Carreidas, a character in the Tintin comic Flight 714 to Sydney
 Lazlo Hollyfeld, in the 1985 film Real Genius
 Lazlo Gogolak, the villain in the 2004 comedy film The Whole Ten Yards
 Laszlo W. Kovic, a CIA agent in the video game Battlefield 4
 Lazlo Zand, in the Robotech universe
 Lazlo Curious, a character who lives in the Strangetown neighborhood in The Sims 2
 Lazlo, a character in Salvation (TV series)
 Lazlo Valentin, the alter ego of DC Comics supervillain Professor Pyg
 Dr. Laszlo Kreizler, titular character of the novel The Alienist and its TV adaptation
 Lazlo Strange, the protagonist in Laini Taylor's book Strange the Dreamer
 Laszlo Cravensworth, a vampire from the sitcom What We Do in the Shadows 
 Laszlo, a character in the video game Half-Life 2
 Dr. Laszlo Jamf, a character in the novel Gravity's Rainbow

Surname

Science and mathematics
 Alexander Laszlo (scientist) (1964), American systems scientist
 Ernő László (1897–1973), Hungarian-born American dermatologist and cosmetic businessman
 Ervin László (b. 1932), Hungarian philosopher of science, systems theorist, and integral theorist
 Yves Laszlo, French mathematician working in the École Polytechnique

Music
 Ferenc László (1937–2010), Romanian musicologist and flautist
 Ken Laszlo, Italian pop singer
 Viktor Lazlo (born 1960), stage name of Belgian singer Sonia Dronier
 Willem Laszlo (born 1998), Dutch electronic music producer on Monstercat

Film
 Andrew Laszlo (1926–2011) Hungarian-American cinematographer
 Ernest Laszlo (1898–1984), Hungarian-American cinematographer and Academy Award winner
 Hana Laszlo (b. 1953) Israeli actress and comedian who won the Best Actress Award at the 2005 Cannes Film Festival

Sports
 Csaba László (footballer born 1964), Hungarian football player and manager
 Csaba László (footballer born 1967), Hungarian football player
 László Szollás (1907–1980), world champion and Olympic medalist pair skater.

Other
 Miklós László (1903–1973), Hungarian-American playwright
 Paul László, (1900–1993), architect
 Philip de László (1869–1937), Hungarian painter known for portraits of royalty and aristocrats
 Lucy de László (1870–1950), Irish wife of Philip de László
 Tony László (b. 1960), journalist

Fictional characters
 Carl Lazlo, Esq., an idealistic lawyer in the 1980 movie Where the Buffalo Roam
 Victor Laszlo, in the 1942 film Casablanca (film), played by Paul Henreid

See also
 Albert-László Barabási, Hungarian-Romanian scientist
 Ladislaus (disambiguation)
 Lazlow Jones, American talk show host and game developer, known for his work on the Grand Theft Auto series
 Laszlo Toth is a pen name for comedian and humorist Don Novello

References

Hungarian masculine given names
Surnames of Slavic origin